Pieter Gruijters (born 24 July 1967) is a Paralympic athlete from Netherlands competing F56 seated throws and P56 pentathlon events.

He competed in the 2004 Summer Paralympics in Athens, Greece.  There he won a silver medal in the men's Pentathlon - P54-58 event, a silver medal in the men's Javelin throw - F55-56 event and finished eleventh in the men's Shot put - F56 event.  He also competed at the 2008 Summer Paralympics in Beijing, China.    There he won a gold medal in the men's Javelin throw - F55-56 event and finished seventh in the men's Shot put - F55-56 event

He is world record holder in javelin for F56 classified athletes.

References

External links
 
 official website

1967 births
Living people
Paralympic athletes of the Netherlands
Athletes (track and field) at the 2004 Summer Paralympics
Athletes (track and field) at the 2008 Summer Paralympics
Paralympic gold medalists for the Netherlands
Paralympic silver medalists for the Netherlands
Sportspeople from Helmond
World record holders in Paralympic athletics
Medalists at the 2004 Summer Paralympics
Medalists at the 2008 Summer Paralympics
Paralympic medalists in athletics (track and field)
Dutch male javelin throwers
Dutch pentathletes
20th-century Dutch people
21st-century Dutch people